Alfredo Ciríaco Devincenzi, last name also spelled de Vincenzi (June 9, 1907 – ?) was an Italian Argentine professional football player. He played for Argentina national football team at the 1934 FIFA World Cup, but he also held Italian citizenship and later played for the Italy national B team.

References

External links
 Career summary by playerhistory.com

1907 births
Year of death missing
Argentine footballers
Argentine people of Italian descent
Argentina international footballers
Club Atlético River Plate footballers
Racing Club de Avellaneda footballers
Serie A players
Inter Milan players
San Lorenzo de Almagro footballers
1934 FIFA World Cup players
Argentine Primera División players
Association football forwards
Footballers from Buenos Aires